Trace Repeat is a funk and soul band from Oakland, California. 


Background 
Trace Repeat was founded in early 2015 by co-band leaders Wesley Woo and Zach Hing, drummer Ben Peterson, and ex-member/saxophonist Adam Dietz. The band began as a side project immediately following Woo's first tour to South by Southwest as a solo artist. The remaining band members (Dan Wilson, David Kaiser-Jones, Noah Foley-Beining, and Khrizia Kamille) joined the band after the original four members recorded and shopped around its first early demos in 2015.

Founder and co-band leader Zach Hing parted ways with Trace Repeat in August 2018 due to personal differences. The band's recording and touring schedule continued uninterrupted with its five remaining members, and contributions from Zach Parkes (bass), Rei Otsuka (bass), and Shawn Miller (bass).

In early 2019 the band officially announced Rei Otsuka as its permanent recording and touring bassist.

Career

Kollaboration 
Trace Repeat found its first early success in May 2016 after catching the attention of Kollaboration talent scout Lauren Lee, who helped the band reach the final round competition of Kollaboration STAR 2016.  After winning Kollaboration’s regional competition in San Francisco, Trace Repeat had their first break on a national stage with their performance at Kollaboration STAR 2016, sharing the stage with artists like JR Aquino, Paul Dateh, Jane Lui, and Tim DeLaGhetto.

Asian American Empowerment 
Following their appearance at Kollaboration STAR, Trace Repeat continued to build momentum with the release of their Indiegogo crowdfunding campaign in January 2017. The campaign garnered media attention due to its focus on Asian American empowerment and the demasculinization of Asian American men in film and media. According to NBC Asian America, “While the band wasn't sure how people would respond to their overtly empowerment-themed campaign, the message resonated. Trace Repeat raised more than $8,000 — most of it from strangers — and surpassed their goal by more than 50 percent.”

The Oaktown Sound (2017) 
Trace Repeat released their debut album The Oaktown Sound in September 2017. The album’s first print was released on CD, vinyl, and 3 ½ inch floppy disc. Alternative Press calls the album, “intentionally referential to some of the 50s and 60s R&B you might hear on a James Brown or Ray Charles record. A lot of that high energy James Brown intensity, underscored by that Clyde Stubblefield 'funky drummer' kind of attitude in the rhythm section.”

Band Members

Current Members 
 Wesley Woo - voice, guitar 
 Ben Peterson - drums 
 Daniel Wilson - tenor, baritone saxophone 
 Khrizia Kamille - voice, percussion 
 Maddie Liu - trombone 
 Rei Otsuka - bass guitar, keys, synth 
 Zach Thorne - trumpet

Frequent Collaborators 
 Brent Elberg - drums, keys 
 Jeremy Propp - drums 
 Adam Thomson - bass 
 Shawn Miller - bass 
 Zach Parkes - bass 
 Alex Jimenez - bass 
 Chris Lundeen - trombone 
 Lindsay Alexis Smith - trombone 
 Oscar Villagrana - trumpet 
 Josh Sherman - trumpet 
 Devin Hollister - tenor saxophone 
 Noah Rosen - tenor saxophone 
 Rocky Mandayam - alto saxophone 
 Greg Yee - keys 
 Mario Noche - percussion

Past Collaborators 
 Jae Jin - vocal, acoustic guitar 
 Brendan Dreaper - drums 
 Cadence Myles - drums 
 Chris Andersen - trombone 
 Cierra Davis - drums 
 Jesse Elkin Rubin - tenor, baritone saxophone 
 Matt Kelly - trumpet 
 Will Berg - alto saxophone 
 Zach Zarcone - drums

Past members 
 Adam Dietz - alto saxophone 
 David Kaiser-Jones - trombone 
 Ellisa Sun - voice 
 Heather Michelle - voice 
 Itoro Udofia - voice 
 Noah Foley-Beining - drums, keys, cowbell 
 Zach Hing - voice, guitar, bass 
 Froilan Vicente - tenor saxophone

References 

American funk musical groups